The 1831 Alabama gubernatorial election was an election held on August 1, 1831, to elect the governor of Alabama. Jacksonian candidate John Gayle beat the incumbent Jacksonian governor Samuel B. Moore and National Republican candidate Nicholas Davis with 55.01% of the vote.

General election

Candidates
Nicholas Davis, member of the Alabama House of Representatives 1819–1820.
John Gayle, member of the Alabama House of Representatives 1822–1823 and 1829–1830.
Samuel B. Moore, governor of Alabama since March 1831.

Results

By county

References

Notes 

Alabama gubernatorial elections
Alabama
1831 Alabama elections
August 1831 events